Ivanhoe Girls' Grammar School, is an independent, Anglican, day school for girls, located in Ivanhoe, an eastern suburb of Melbourne, Victoria, Australia.
Established in 1903, the school has a non-selective enrolment policy and currently caters for over 850 students from the Early Learning Centre (ELC) to Year 12. 

Ivanhoe Girls' Grammar School is affiliated with the Association of Heads of Independent Schools of Australia (AHISA), the Junior School Heads Association of Australia (JSHAA), the Alliance of Girls' Schools Australasia (AGSA), the Association of Independent Schools of Victoria (AISV), and is a founding member of Girls Sport Victoria (GSV).

Campus
Classes are held in a number of different buildings. There is a senior and junior library, and café, Arts and Hospitality Centre and many other facilities. The Performing Arts Centre, visible from Upper Heidelberg Road, is used frequently both for school performances and external performances (including the local Heidelberg Symphony Orchestra).

Curriculum

Languages and exchange
Languages taught include French and Chinese. Foreign exchanges are offered bi-annually, in addition to cultural trips with their sister school St. Agnes in Kyoto, Japan.

A bi-annual Art and Hospitality trip to Europe was introduced in 2005 which includes visiting Paris, London, Venice, Florence and Rome over a period of 17 days, where students visit various galleries and attend cooking classes.

Co-curriculum

Sport
The school is a member of Girls’ Sport Victoria, alongside 24 other Victorian independent girls’ schools. Sport facilities include an all-weather, multi-purpose sports surface, including an athletics track and jumps strips, as well as an indoor swimming pool. The school is also actively involved in skiing and frequently participates in competitions at various levels.

GSV premierships 
Ivanhoe Girls' Grammar has won the following GSV premierships.

 Basketball (2) - 2009, 2018
 Soccer - 2002
 Softball - 2013
 Tennis - 2017
 Volleyball - 2010

Music
The school has an extensive musical program including on-campus private tuition and a wide range of musical ensembles. The Junior School offers the Junior Band, the Junior Flute Ensemble, Junior Choir, and Irwin Orchestra while the Senior School offers a wider range of choirs: Cantabile (years 7–9) and Concordia (years 10–12), both of which are non-auditioned, as well as the auditioned choirs Bel Canto (years 7–9) and Chamber Choir (years 10–12). Instrumental ensembles on the senior level include the Jazz Band, Bowie Orchestra, Boaden Orchestra, String Orchestra, Concert Band and Stage Band.

Debating
Ivanhoe Girls' is actively involved in debating and participates in the annual competition run by the Debating Association of Victoria. With regional Swannie Award winners in the DAV competitions each year, Ivanhoe Girls’ has a firm alumni base, members of whom go on to adjudication roles . The Greenway Cup, an annual debate against regional rival Ivanhoe Grammar Ridgeway School, takes a more light-hearted approach than conventional debating. This competition is contested by the senior class, with speakers often taking a less formal stance while competing to uphold the school's integrity. There are also junior debating for years 7-8 in a group.

Drama
The school has annual school productions, which include a variety of musicals and plays, some which are Australian work. In recent years, the school has put on performances of 42nd Street, Sweet Charity, The Wiz, Away, Picnic at Hanging Rock, The Crucible, Macbeth, Chess, A Midsummer Night's Dream, The Government Inspector and Freaky Friday just to name a few. The school also has a student run drama program called AIM (Arts in Motion) Drama which allows students to discover the dramatic arts and develop their acting skills. At the end of the year, a group of senior students, who run the program, help direct a play, which is performed by a large group of both senior and junior students.

Student-driven philanthropy
Since 1998, the senior class has raised funds for a humanitarian organisation of their choice via a charity concert held each year. The year level are given four weeks to prepare this much anticipated event in the School's calendar. The Class of 2012 holds the current record of $67,500 AUD for BeyondWater. The class of 2011 raised $47,675 AUD for a small humanitarian organisation based in Melbourne- Front Yard Youth Services. The Class of 2008 raised $47,000.00 AUD for the Australian charity organisation Kids Under Cover. The Class of 2010 raised over $43,000 for The Alannah and Madeline Foundation.

House system 
As with most Australian schools, Ivanhoe Girls' Grammar School uses a house system. Students are divided into six houses, named after characters and places in Sir Walter Scott's Ivanhoe.
 Rotherwood (Blue)
 Locksley (White)
 Rowena (Yellow)
 Ashby (Red)
 Oswald (Green)
 York (Purple)
The school awards points to each house, based on house-wide achievements in a number of fields including sports and debating.  Individuals can also earn points for their house for their own individual achievements.  These points are cumulated at the end of the year, and the winning house is announced at the School's "Celebration Night".

Uniform 
There are three different uniforms: the summer uniform (worn in terms 1 and 4), the winter uniform (terms 2 and 3), and the sports uniform, for PE classes and other sporting activities. The winter uniform, as well as the blazer, was redesigned in 2005 by Jane Lamerton, a former student of the school, along with a committee of students and teachers. Redesigns of the summer uniform and sports uniform have also been undertaken and are currently available at the uniform shop on campus. Following the redesign of the winter uniform, blue has been added as a school colour, in addition to brown and replacing the yellow.

Notable alumnae
Cate Blanchett, actress/director
Marjory-Dore Martin – Honorary professor of the Faculty of Science and Technology at Deakin University; Former Professor of Science Education and Head of the School of Scientific and Developmental Studies in Education at Deakin University
Jenny Mikakos,  Former Minister for Health; Member of the Legislative Council (ALP) for Northern Metropolitan Region; Former Victorian Parliamentary Secretary for Justice, and MLC (ALP) for Jika Jika Province (also attended Thornbury High School)
Dorothy Ruth Pizzey AM, former Principal of St Catherine's School, Toorak (1977–97); Former Secretary of Council for the Association of Heads of Independent Schools Australia etc.
Ilma Grace Stone, botanist
Alicia Loxley, journalist
Bridie Carter, actress
Rovina Cai, illustrator

See also 
 List of schools in Victoria
 Victorian Certificate of Education

References

External links 
Ivanhoe Girls' Grammar School
Girls' Sport Victoria

Girls' schools in Victoria (Australia)
Anglican secondary schools in Melbourne
Educational institutions established in 1903
Junior School Heads Association of Australia Member Schools
1903 establishments in Australia
Alliance of Girls' Schools Australasia
Buildings and structures in the City of Banyule